Muharud Mukasa is a Ugandan former cyclist. He competed in the individual road race event at the 1984 Summer Olympics.

References

External links
 

Year of birth missing (living people)
Living people
Ugandan male cyclists
Olympic cyclists of Uganda
Cyclists at the 1984 Summer Olympics
Place of birth missing (living people)